Diphyes dispar is a species of siphonophores in the family Diphyidae.

References 

Diphyidae
Animals described in 1821